Cody Dylan Core (born April 17, 1994) is an American football wide receiver who is a free agent. He played college football at Mississippi and was drafted by the Cincinnati Bengals in the sixth round of the 2016 NFL Draft. He has also played for the New York Giants and Miami Dolphins.

Professional career

Cincinnati Bengals
Core was drafted by the Cincinnati Bengals in the sixth round, 199th overall, of the 2016 NFL Draft. In his rookie year, Core played in 8 games with 4 starts, recording 17 receptions for 200 yards.

Core was waived during final roster cuts on August 31, 2019.

New York Giants

On September 1, 2019, Core was claimed off waivers by the New York Giants.

On March 26, 2020, Core re-signed with the Giants. He was placed on injured reserve on August 19, 2020, after tearing his Achilles tendon in practice. He was released after the season on March 8, 2021.

Miami Dolphins
On November 29, 2021, Core was signed to the Miami Dolphins practice squad. He signed a reserve/future contract with the Dolphins on January 11, 2022. He was released on July 26, 2022.

References

External links 
 New York Giants bio
 Ole Miss Rebels bio

1994 births
Living people
American football wide receivers
Auburn High School (Alabama) alumni
Cincinnati Bengals players
Miami Dolphins players
New York Giants players
Ole Miss Rebels football players
Players of American football from Alabama
Sportspeople from Auburn, Alabama